Michelle Leahy Ferreri  is a Canadian politician who has been the member of Parliament (MP) for Peterborough—Kawartha since 2021, as a member of the Conservative Party.

Background 
Ferreri attended Trent University and worked as a television news anchor for the local Peterborough television station CHEX-DT before entering politics. She is a mother of three children with her former spouse.

Political career 
Ferreri was elected to the House of Commons in the 2021 Canadian federal election defeating incumbent Liberal cabinet minister Maryam Monsef.

She faced criticism in 2022 when she described herself as a "single mom with six children" during a debate in Parliament. According to her website, Ferreri is a mother of three children and "shares her life with her supportive partner, Ryan, and his three daughters". When asked for an interview by Global News regarding her comment, she declined, citing privacy reasons.

Electoral record

Peterborough—Kawartha

References

External links

Living people
21st-century Canadian journalists
21st-century Canadian women politicians
21st-century Canadian politicians
Canadian women television journalists
Journalists from Ontario
Members of the House of Commons of Canada from Ontario
Conservative Party of Canada MPs
People from Peterborough, Ontario
Women members of the House of Commons of Canada
Year of birth missing (living people)